Brownsfield Mill, Binns Place, Great Ancoats Street, Manchester, England, is an early nineteenth century room and cotton-spinning power mill constructed in 1825. Hartwell describes it as "unusually complete and well preserved." The chimney is now Manchester's oldest surviving mill chimney. It is a Grade II* listed building.  The building housed the A.V. Roe and Company aviation factory in the early twentieth century.

See also

Listed buildings in Manchester-M1

Notes

References 
 

Textile mills in Manchester
Former textile mills in the United Kingdom
Brick buildings and structures
Buildings and structures completed in 1825
1825 establishments in England
Grade II* listed buildings in Manchester
Grade II* listed industrial buildings